Zvi Hirsch Chajes  ( - November 20, 1805 - October 12, 1855; also Chayes or Hayot or Chiyos) was one of the foremost Galician talmudic scholars. He is best known for his work Mevo Hatalmud (Introduction to the Talmud), which serves both as commentary and introduction. Chajes is also known as "The Maharatz Chajes", the Hebrew acronym for "Our Teacher, the Rabbi, Zvi Chajes".

Biography
Chajes was born in Brody. He studied under a number of great scholars of that time, particularly R. Ephraim Zalman Margulies. In addition to his traditional talmudic education, he was educated in modern and classical languages and literature, as well as geography, history and philosophy. In 1846, a law was promulgated in Austria compelling rabbinical candidates to pass a university examination in the liberal arts and philosophy; Chajes received the degree of Doctor of Philosophy.

At twenty two, he was called to occupy an important rabbinic position in the district of Zhovkva (Zolkiev), Galicia. In this position, he fought against the innovations being introduced into Judaism at that time, while also opposing the increasing conservatism among his Orthodox colleagues. Chajes died prematurely in 1855 at the age of 50, only three years after being appointed to the prestigious post of rabbi of Kalisz (Kalish), Poland.

Chajes produced many works of scientific study of Judaism that were faithful to tradition but modern in their orientation and organization. In this role he is closely associated with Nachman Krochmal and S. L. Rapoport. "There are few modern works dealing in detail with the Halakha or the Haggadah which have not profited by the labors of Chajes, although his name is often passed over in silence. His Introduction to the Talmud is especially noteworthy..." . Dr. Bruria Hutner David describes Chajes as "Traditionalist and Maskil" - as the subject of her PhD thesis.

The name Zvi Hirsch is a bilingual tautological name in Yiddish. It means literally "deer-deer" and is traceable back to the Hebrew word צבי tsvi "deer" and the German word Hirsch "deer".

Works
Mevo Hatalmud (The Student's Guide Through the Talmud, English edition published by Feldheim, 1952) deals with both the Halakha, the legal aspects of the Talmud, and the Aggadah, the non-legal portions. In this work, Chajes imparts a detailed history and classification of the Talmud and its underlying oral tradition. This work is the first modern attempt on the part of Orthodoxy to formulate the nature, extent, and authority of tradition.

Chajes also authored: 
Torat Neviim: treatises on the authority of Talmudic tradition, and on the organic structure and methodology of the Talmud. 
Darkhei Horaah: an examination of the rules that obtained in Talmudic times in deciding practical religious questions.  
Imre Binah: treatises on the relation of Babylonian and Jerusalem Talmuds, on lost aggadah collections, on the Targumim, on Rashi's commentary to tractate Taanit, and on Bath Kol.
Tiferet L'Moshe
Minhat Kenaot: against Reform Judaism.
 Glosses to the Talmud, now published as standard in the Romm-Vilna edition of the Talmud.

References

Resources
 "Mevo Hatalmud". Trans. The Students' Guide Through The Talmud, 2 ed., Jacob Shachter, Yashar Books, 2005. 
 "Rebi Tzvi Hirsch Chayes", Meir Hershkowits, Mossad Harav Kook, 1972
 Chamiel Ephraim, The Middle Way - The Emergence of Modern Religious Trends in Nineteenth-Century Judaism, Academic Studies Press, Brighton 2014, Vol I, pp 34–39, 67-81, 179-219, 365-391, Vol II' pp. 15–37, 139-151, 224-237, 295-298.

External links
Chajes, jewishencyclopedia.com
 Zevi Hirsch Chajes, jewishhistory.org.il
Bruria Hutner David thesis, 1971

Orthodox rabbis from Galicia (Eastern Europe)
Polish Orthodox rabbis
Ukrainian Orthodox rabbis
19th-century rabbis from the Russian Empire
1805 births
1855 deaths